Louis Philip may refer to:

 Louis Philip, Count Palatine of Simmern-Kaiserslautern (1602–1655)
 Louis Philip, Count Palatine of Guttenberg (1577–1601)

See also
 Luis Filipe (disambiguation)